Nestori Kallenpoika Toivonen (25 March 1865 – 6 April 1927) was a Finnish sport shooter who competed in the 1912 Summer Olympics and in the 1920 Summer Olympics.

In 1912 he won two bronze medals, as part of the Finnish team, which won the bronze medal in the 100 metre running deer, single shots event as well as in the 100 metre running deer, single shots individual event. He also participated in the 300 metre free rifle, three positions event, but he did not finish.

In 1920 he again won two medals, a silver medal in the 100 m running deer, single shots team and a bronze medal in the 100 m running deer, double shots team. In addition he finished seventh in the 300 m army rifle, prone and eleventh as part of the 50 m army pistol team.

He was born in Kuorevesi and died in Sakkola.

References

External links
profile

1865 births
1927 deaths
People from Jämsä
People from Häme Province (Grand Duchy of Finland)
Finnish male sport shooters
Running target shooters
Shooters at the 1912 Summer Olympics
Shooters at the 1920 Summer Olympics
Olympic shooters of Finland
Olympic silver medalists for Finland
Olympic bronze medalists for Finland
Olympic medalists in shooting
Medalists at the 1912 Summer Olympics
Medalists at the 1920 Summer Olympics
Sportspeople from Central Finland